"Romeo Me" is a song by Britpop band Sleeper, written by the band's vocalist and guitarist Louise Wener. "Romeo Me" was the second and final single released from Sleeper's third album Pleased to Meet You and became the group's eighth and last top forty hit on the UK Singles Chart. 

"Romeo Me" was originally titled "Romeo & Juliet", and the chorus lyrics reference the titular couple, Mark Anthony and Cleopatra as well as Marilyn Monroe and Joe DiMaggio, who feature on the cover art for the vinyl format. B-side "Cunt London" was the working title for the third album.

Track listing

UK 7" single Indolent SLEEP 017 (No'd ltd edition, clear vinyl)

"Romeo Me" 
"Cunt London" 

UK CD single Indolent SLEEP 017CD1

"Romeo Me" 
"This Is the Sound of Someone Else" 
"What Do I Get"
"Nice Guy Eddie (Peel Session)"

UK CD single Indolent SLEEP 017CD2

"Romeo Me" 
"When Will You Smile?" 
"What Do I Do Now? (Evening Session)"
"Motorway Man (Artic mix)"

Comprehensive Charts

References

External links
"Romeo Me" music video

1997 singles
Sleeper (band) songs
Songs written by Louise Wener
Song recordings produced by Stephen Street
1997 songs